Immunodeficiency 26 is a rare genetic syndrome. It is characterised by absent circulating B and T cells and normal natural killer cells.

Signs and symptoms

The features of this condition include recurrent candidiasis and lower respiratory tract infections.

Genetics

This condition is due to mutations in the DNA-PKcs gene and is inheritable in an autosomal recessive fashion. The gene is located on the long arm of chromosome 8 (8q11.21) on the minus strand. It encodes a protein of 4128 amino acids with a predicted molecular weight of 469 kiloDaltons. The encoded protein is a protein kinase that is activated by DNA. This protein acts as a sensor for damaged DNA.

Diagnosis
Diagnosis is made by examination of the circulating lymphocytes and gene sequencing.

Differential diagnosis
 Ataxia telangectasia
 Artemis deficiency
 LIG4 syndrome
 Nijmegen breakage syndrome
 Severe combined immunodeficiency with Cernunnos
 X-linked agammaglobulinemia

Management

Epidemiology
This condition is rare. Only two cases have been described up to 2017.

History

This condition was described in 2009 by van der Burg et al.

References

Rare syndromes
Genetic diseases and disorders
Congenital disorders